Valentin Bratoev (October 21, 1987 in Sofia) is a Bulgarian volleyball player a member of Bulgaria men's national volleyball team and Bulgarian club CSKA Sofia. Bratoev won bronze medals with the national team in the 2009 Men's European Volleyball Championship and won 2010–11 CEV Champions League with Trentino. His twin brother Georgi Bratoev also plays volleyball for Bulgaria.

Club 
  Slavia Sofia (2002-2007)
  Levski Sofia (2007-2009)
  Pallavolo Massa (2009-2010)
  Trentino (2010-2011)
  Callipo Vibo Valentia (2011-2011)
  Argos Sora (2011-2012)
  Al-Rayyan (2012-2013)
  Levski Sofia (2012-2013)
  Friedrichshafen (2013-2014)
  GFC Ajaccio (2014-2015)
  Shahrdari Tabriz (2015-2016)
  CSKA Sofia (2016-2017)
  Neftochimic 2010 (2017-2018)
  JTEKT Stings (2018-2019)
  Al Arabi Qatar (2019-2020)

References

External links
 About profile in 2013 Fivb World League
 Profile in Legavolley.it
 Profile in Trentinovolley.it

1987 births
Living people
Bulgarian men's volleyball players
Volleyball players at the 2015 European Games
European Games medalists in volleyball
European Games silver medalists for Bulgaria
Volleyball players at the 2012 Summer Olympics
Olympic volleyball players of Bulgaria
Bulgarian twins